The women's pentathlon at the 1954 European Athletics Championships was held in Bern, Switzerland, at Stadion Neufeld on 27 August 1954.

Medalists

Results

Final
27 August

Participation
According to an unofficial count, 19 athletes from 12 countries participated in the event.

 (1)
 (2)
 (2)
 (1)
 (1)
 (1)
 (1)
 (3)
 (1)
 (2)
 (3)
 (1)

References

Pentathlon
Combined events at the European Athletics Championships
Euro